Concrete Blonde was an American alternative rock band from Hollywood, California. They were initially active from 1982 to 1994, and reunited twice: first from 2001 to 2004, and again from 2010 to 2012. They were best known for their album Bloodletting (1990), its top 20 single "Joey", and Johnette Napolitano's distinctive vocal style.

Career
Singer-songwriter/bassist Johnette Napolitano first formed a group with guitarist James Mankey in Los Angeles, in 1982. Their first recording was the song "Heart Attack", released under the band name Dreamers on the compilation album, The D.I.Y. Album (1982). Joined by drummer Michael Murphy, they became Dream 6, releasing an eponymous extended play in on the independent label "Happy Hermit" in 1983 (released in France in 1985 by Madrigal). When they signed with I.R.S. Records in 1986, their label-mate Michael Stipe suggested the name Concrete Blonde, describing the contrast between their hard rock music and introspective lyrics. They were joined by drummer Harry Rushakoff on their eponymous debut album.

Their first release was Concrete Blonde (1986), which included their debut single "Still in Hollywood".  They added a full time bass guitarist, Alan Bloch, for their album Free (1989). This allowed Napolitano to focus on her singing without the burden of playing the bass at the same time. This album included the college radio hit "God Is a Bullet".

Their third album, Bloodletting (1990), became their most commercially successful, reaching #4 in Canada, #8 in Australia, #49 in the United States and was certified Gold in the United States and Australia. Roxy Music drummer Paul Thompson replaced Rushakoff on Bloodletting while Rushakoff was in treatment for drug addiction. Napolitano also reassumed bass duties for the recording, and Bloch does not appear on the album (or the band's subsequent albums).  The album was certified gold by the RIAA and included their highest charting single, "Joey", which spent 21 weeks on the Billboard Top 100 Chart, peaking at 19, and #2 in Australia.

Walking in London (1992) saw the return of original drummer Rushakoff (due to Thompson's immigration problems) and its successor Mexican Moon (1993) included the Bloodletting lineup with Thompson back on drums. Neither album performed as well commercially as Bloodletting, and Napolitano broke up the band in 1994.

The band reunited in 1997, with Napolitano and Mankey teaming up with the band Los Illegals for the album Concrete Blonde y Los Illegals. The vocals were primarily in Spanish. During live shows, the band changed the refrain for "Still in Hollywood" to "Still in the Barrio", and featured covers of Led Zeppelin's "Immigrant Song" and Jimi Hendrix's "Little Wing".

The band reunited again in 2001 and released the album Group Therapy (2002).  The album was recorded in 10 days and included Rushakoff once again on drums. Rushakoff was eventually kicked out of the band for failing to appear at scheduled performances. After initially being replaced on tour by lighting tech Mike Devitt, he was eventually replaced on a long-term basis by Gabriel Ramirez. Mojave was released in 2004.

Members
 Johnette Napolitano - bass, vocals (1982-1994, 2001-2006, 2012)
 James Mankey - guitar (1982-1994, 2001-2006, 2012)
 Harry Rushakoff - drums (1985-1989, 1992, 2001-2002)
 Alan Bloch - bass (1988-1989)
 Paul Thompson - drums (1989-1991, 1993-1994)
 Mike Devitt - drums (2002)
 Gabriel Ramirez - drums (2003-2006, 2012)

Timeline

Retirement and post-retirement 
On June 5, 2006, Napolitano announced that the band had officially retired. From the Concrete Blonde website, there was the following open message: "Thanks to everyone who heard and believed in the music. Music lives on. Keep listening. Keep believing, keep dreaming. Like a ripple, the music moves and travels and finds you. Drive to the music, Make love to the music, cry to the music. That's why we made it. Long after we're gone the music will still be there. Thanks to everyone who helped us bring the music to you & thanks to every face and every heart in every audience all over the world."

On July 13, 2010, Shout! Factory released a remastered 20th anniversary edition of Bloodletting. It features six bonus tracks: "I Want You", "Little Wing", the French extended version of "Bloodletting (The Vampire Song)", and live versions of "Roses Grow", "The Sky Is A Poisonous Garden", and "Tomorrow, Wendy". An error in the packaging of the re-release uses early non-album period photos featuring original drummer Harry Rushakoff, who had been replaced the night before the first studio session for "Bloodletting" by Roxy Music drummer Paul Thompson. The band followed the release with the "20 Years of Bloodletting: The Vampires Rise" tour through the rest of that year.

In 2012, the band released the single "Rosalie" with the B-side "I Know the Ghost". In December 2012, the band engaged in a small tour of nine cities, mostly on the east coast of the U.S.

Discography

Studio albums
 Concrete Blonde (1986)
 Free (1989)
 Bloodletting (1990)
 Walking in London (1992)
 Mexican Moon (1993)
 Concrete Blonde y Los Illegals (1997) – collaboration with a Los Angeles-based Chicano punk band Los Illegals
 Group Therapy (2002)
 Mojave (2004)

Compilation and live albums
 Still in Hollywood (1994) – compilation of live recordings, B-sides, and previously unreleased material
 Recollection: The Best of Concrete Blonde (1996) – compilation of 17 tracks from first five albums, plus live cover version of Mercedes Benz.
 Classic Masters (2002) – 24-bit remastering of 12 tracks from first five albums
 Live in Brazil 2002 (2003) – double live album
  The Essential (2005) – includes 13 remastered tracks from first four albums, and a different version of the song "Sun"

Non-album tracks

 I Want You – B-side on Joey [single] (1990); Point Break soundtrack (1991).
 Crystal Blue Persuasion – In Defense of Animals (1993), compilation album.
 Mercedes Benz (Live) (Janis Joplin) – included on  Recollection: The Best of Concrete Blonde (1996)
 Endless Sleep (Dolores Nance/Jody Reynolds) – Fast Track to Nowhere (1994), soundtrack album to the series Rebel Highway
 The God in You (MantraMix) – Roxy CD single (2002)
 Joey (live, acoustic) – Live from the CD101 Big Room (Vol. 1) (2003)
 Sun (alternate version) – included on  The Essential Concrete Blonde (2005)
 Rosalie / I Know The Ghost (J. Napolitano) – Rosalie [single], 2011

Singles

References

Further reading
Huey, Steve. "[ Concrete Blonde]" AllMusic Guide. Retrieved on May 20, 2007.
Golde, Kimberlye (2002). "Almost Famous" San Francisco Herald. Retrieved on May 20, 2007

External links
History of Concrete Blonde w/ Johnette Napolitano

Alternative rock groups from California
Musical groups established in 1982
Musical groups disestablished in 2004
Musical groups reestablished in 2010
I.R.S. Records artists
Musical groups from Los Angeles
1982 establishments in California
Female-fronted musical groups